Jack Jewsbury (born April 13, 1981) is a retired American soccer player who played primarily as a midfielder. Upon his retirement in 2016, Jewsbury was one of ten players to have appeared in more than 350 matches in Major League Soccer.

Career

Youth and college
Jewsbury was born in Joplin, Missouri. He attended Kickapoo High School in Springfield, Missouri, where he scored a state record 59 goals in his senior season and 124 goals in his four-year high school career. He was named First-team All-Midwest Region, All-State, All-District, All-Ozark Conference and conference Player of the Year as a senior, and was a three-time All-District and All-State selection, before having his #21 jersey retired.

Jewsbury played five years of college soccer at Saint Louis University, finishing his career tied for tenth on the school's all-time scoring list with 101 points.  Jewsbury was twice named first team All-Conference USA, winning the Conference Player of the Year award as a sophomore. During his college years, he also played with Kansas City Brass in the Premier Development League.

Professional

Kansas City Wizards
Jewsbury was drafted 43rd overall in the 2003 MLS SuperDraft by the Kansas City Wizards, and signed to a developmental contract.  As a rookie, Jewsbury struggled for playing time, appearing for only 61 minutes all season.  In July and August 2003, the Wizards sent Jewsbury on loan to the Syracuse Salty Dogs of the USL A-League.  In his second year, however, Jewsbury played much more, becoming a significant utility player for the Wizards. That year he helped the club capture the 2004 Lamar Hunt U.S. Open Cup and the Western Conference title. He continued to progress with the club and soon became a very influential player for Kansas City. In eight years with the club, the central midfielder would appear in 195 league matches and score 14 goals.

Portland Timbers
Jewsbury was traded to the Portland Timbers for allocation money on March 1, 2011.  Jewsbury was given the captain's armband, becoming the expansion side's first captain in MLS. Jewsbury was named to the 2011 MLS All-Star Game, finishing the season with career highs in both goals and assists. In the 2012 season, Jewsbury scored the winning goal as Portland defeated the Vancouver Whitecaps to win the Cascadia Cup trophy. As his playing time declined, Jewsbury was named "club captain" as other players took over the role of on-field captain. Jewsbury appeared in all of the Timbers' playoff games during his tenure with the club, including the Timbers' victory in MLS Cup 2015.

Retirement
Jewsbury announced his retirement in September 2016, during the annual "Stand Together" community outreach banquet hosted by the Timbers and the Portland Thorns. Several players, including long-time teammate Darlington Nagbe, expressed their appreciation of Jewsbury.

After retiring, Jewsbury was hired by the Timbers in a non-playing capacity as Director of Business Development.

Honors

Club
Kansas City Wizards
Lamar Hunt U.S. Open Cup (1): 2004
Western Conference (playoffs) (1): 2004

Portland Timbers
MLS Cup (1): 2015
Western Conference (playoffs) (1): 2015
Western Conference (regular season) (1): 2013

Individual
MLS All-Star: 2011

References

External links
 

1981 births
Living people
American soccer players
Association football midfielders
Kansas City Brass players
Major League Soccer All-Stars
Major League Soccer players
People from Springfield, Missouri
Portland Timbers players
Saint Louis Billikens men's soccer players
Soccer players from Missouri
Sporting Kansas City draft picks
Sporting Kansas City players
Sportspeople from Joplin, Missouri
Syracuse Salty Dogs players
A-League (1995–2004) players
USL League Two players